Miles Gregory is a New Zealand / UK theatre director and theatrical producer.

Background
Born in Wellington, New Zealand, Miles attended King's College, Auckland and was the head of Peart house, before reading for a BA in Modern History at Durham University, UK. He holds a PhD in Shakespeare in Performance from Bristol University and a Master of Fine Arts in Staging Shakespeare from Exeter University.

He was formerly founding artistic director of the Bristol Shakespeare Festival and the British Touring Shakespeare Company, before being appointed as Artistic Director and CEO of The Maltings Theatre & Cinema, Berwick-upon-Tweed, UK, in 2008. He returned to NZ with his family in 2012.

In 2015, Gregory founded Pop-up Globe, a New Zealand theatre company that performed Shakespeare's plays in temporary, 'pop-up' replicas of the second Globe Theatre, and served as artistic director of the company. In addition to five seasons in Auckland in 2016–2020, Pop-up Globe toured internationally to Australia, with seasons in Perth, Melbourne and Sydney, winning some fifteen awards and performing to over 650,000 people.

For his work with Pop-up Globe he received numerous awards including a Sir Peter Blake Leader Award, Best Director for A Midsummer Night's Dream from BroadwayWorld Sydney Awards and a Denizen Magazine Heroes Award.

References 

Year of birth missing (living people)
Living people
21st-century New Zealand male actors
Artistic directors
Alumni of the University of Bristol
Alumni of the University of Exeter
People educated at King's College, Auckland
Alumni of University College, Durham
New Zealand theatre directors